The premier of Newfoundland and Labrador is the first minister and head of government for the Canadian province of Newfoundland and Labrador. Since 1949, the premier's duties and office has been the successor to the ministerial position of the prime minister of the former Dominion of Newfoundland. Before 2001, the official title was Premier of Newfoundland.

The premier is appointed by the lieutenant governor of Newfoundland and Labrador, as representative of the King in Right of Newfoundland and Labrador. They are usually the leader of the party that commands a majority in the House of Assembly. The word premier is derived from the French word of the same spelling, meaning "first"; and ultimately from the Latin word primarius, meaning "primary".

The current premier of Newfoundland and Labrador is Andrew Furey, since August 19, 2020. He currently represents Humber-Gros Morne in the Newfoundland and Labrador House of Assembly.

Formal responsibilities
The responsibilities of the premier usually include:
 serving as the president of the Executive Council and head of the provincial Cabinet. The Executive Council is the formal name of the Cabinet when it is acting in its legal capacity.
 serving as the head of the provincial government
 leading the development and implementation of government policies and priorities
 serving as the senior communicator of government priorities and plans between:
 the lieutenant governor and Cabinet
 the Newfoundland and Labrador government and other provincial and territorial governments
 the Newfoundland and Labrador government and the federal government and international governments
 functions in respect of the Province of Newfoundland and Labrador, such as recommending to the lieutenant governor the appointment of cabinet ministers and allocating ministerial portfolios
 serving as leader of a major political party and its caucus of MHAs
 representing their constituency in the House of Assembly

Office of the Premier of Newfoundland and Labrador

The Office of the Premier is located at the Confederation Building East Block. Staff at the office consists of:

 Director of Communications
 Special assistant (Strategic Communications)
 Special assistant (Communications)

See also
 Prime Minister of Canada
 Premier (Canada)
 List of premiers of Newfoundland and Labrador

References

External links 
 Premier of Newfoundland and Labrador Official Site

Politics of Newfoundland and Labrador